The 1996 Scottish Cup Final sponsored by Tennents was played on 18 May 1996, at Hampden Park in Glasgow and was the final of the 111th Scottish Cup. Rangers and Hearts contested the match, Rangers won the match 5–1, thanks to a Gordon Durie hat-trick and a Brian Laudrup brace.

Match summary
In the first half Laudrup put Rangers ahead with a low right foot shot into the left corner of the net after a high pass through from Gordon Durie. The second goal came in the fiftieth minute when Laudrup hit a low left footed cross in from the right which Hearts' goalkeeper Gilles Rousset allowed to slip through his hands and under his legs and into the net at the near post. Durie then put Rangers three nil up after he volleyed home with the outside of his right foot after a left wing cross by Laudrup. Colquhoun then pulled a goal back for Hearts with eleven minutes remaining with a low shot, before Durie restored Rangers' three-goal lead a minute later with a right foot shot over the goalkeeper from a Laudrup pass. Durie then completed his hat-trick with a header again from a Laudrup cross from the right. Because of his two goals and overall performance, the final has since become known as the Laudrup Final.

The same teams would contest the 1996 Scottish League Cup Final in November, again won by Rangers, and would meet again in the 1998 Scottish Cup Final with Hearts the victors.

Match details

References

1996
Cup Final
Scottish Cup Final 1996
Scottish Cup Final 1996
1990s in Glasgow
May 1996 sports events in the United Kingdom